Choudhury; also: Choudhuri, Chaudhuri, Choudhuary, Chowdhury) is a sanatan dharma-based- hereditary title of honor which was used to denote only those Brahmins and Kshatriyas  of Gour who are the actual  Rulers of Gour and has royal bloodline.

Population
The population according to the 2001 census was 282,392 (males: 141,512 and females: 140,880).

References

Scheduled Tribes of Gujarat